Leo Solomon Baron (13 October 1916 – 22 October 1985) was a British lawyer, Royal Air Force officer and contract bridge player who practised law in Southern Rhodesia (today Zimbabwe) during the 1950s and 1960s, sat on the Supreme Court of Zambia during the 1970s, and briefly served as Acting Chief Justice of Zimbabwe in 1983.

Biography

Baron was born in Plauen in eastern Germany, the brother of the historian and scientist Jacob Bronowski, and raised in Britain. He read law at King's College London. A contract bridge champion, he developed, with Adam Meredith, the Baron System of bidding during the 1940s.

During the Second World War, Baron was a squadron leader in the Royal Air Force, and was stationed in Southern Rhodesia. He settled there after the war and in 1952 set up a law practice in the self-governing colony's second city, Bulawayo. His clients over the next decade and a half included the prominent black nationalist Joshua Nkomo.

When Ian Smith's government unilaterally declared independence on 11 November 1965, Baron, who challenged the Smith administration's legality, was arrested and kept in solitary confinement until April 1967. He returned to Britain following his release. During the 1970s he returned to Africa to become Deputy Chief Justice of Zambia. While on Zambia's Supreme Court he decided the controversial case Harry Mwaanga Nkumbula, which ruled that the Supreme Court could not prevent the "likely" violation of Zambia's constitution.

Baron was a legal adviser to black nationalist negotiators in the negotiations leading to the Lancaster House Agreement of December 1979, which led to the internationally recognised independence of Zimbabwe the following year. In 1980, he was appointed on a three-year contract to the Appellate Division of the High Court of Zimbabwe. He was appointed Acting Chief Justice of Zimbabwe in 1983, but retired shortly afterwards, citing his health. He died in the Zimbabwean capital Harare on 22 October 1985.

Publications

 Contract Bridge: the Baron system outlined, Baron and Adam Meredith (London: Nicholson & Watson, 1946), 32 pp. 
 The Baron System of Contract Bridge, Baron and Meredith (Leeds: Contract Bridge Equipment Ltd, 1948), 180 pp.

References

Further reading
The New York Times   
 "Rhodesia transfers Nkomo from prison", 17 November 1964, page 3.
 "Rhodesia asserts independence; Britain decries act as treason and applies economic sanctions; Smith is defiant", 12 November 1965, page 1.
 "Rhodesia is like American West with thin coat of Olde England; Enterprise and self-Reliance stressed by the whites, who resent London's attempt to assure blacks' rights", Anthony Lewis, 11 August 1966, page 8.
 "Rhodesian regime opens talks with black nationalist leaders", 7 January 1976.

External links
 The New York Times archive search – payment required, 1923 to 1980

1916 births
1985 deaths
Alumni of King's College London
British and Irish contract bridge players
Royal Air Force squadron leaders
British emigrants to Rhodesia
British expatriates in Zambia
Judges of the Supreme Court of Zimbabwe
People from Bulawayo
People from Plauen
Rhodesian lawyers
British judges on the courts of Zambia
British judges on the courts of Zimbabwe
British people imprisoned abroad
Prisoners and detainees of Rhodesia
White Rhodesian people
20th-century Zimbabwean judges
Royal Air Force personnel of World War II